Heliciopsis montana is a species of plant in the family Proteaceae. It is a tree endemic to Peninsular Malaysia. It is threatened by habitat loss. The Latin specific epithet montana refers to mountains or coming from mountains.

References

montana
Endemic flora of Peninsular Malaysia
Trees of Peninsular Malaysia
Conservation dependent plants
Taxonomy articles created by Polbot